Antrobus is a civil parish in Cheshire West and Chester, England. It is entirely rural, and contains 25 buildings that are recorded in the National Heritage List for England as designated listed buildings, all of which are listed at Grade II. This is the lowest of the three grades, and contains "buildings of national importance and special interest". Apart from St Mark's Church and the former and current Friends' Meeting Houses, all the buildings are houses or are related to farms.

Buildings

See also
Listed buildings in Appleton
Listed buildings in Aston by Budworth
Listed buildings in Comberbach
Listed buildings in Great Budworth
Listed buildings in Stretton
Listed buildings in Whitley

References
Citations

Sources

Listed buildings in Cheshire West and Chester
Lists of listed buildings in Cheshire